VV Corvi (abbreviated as VV Crv) is a close spectroscopic binary in the constellation Corvus. It is also an eclipsing binary, varying from magnitude 5.19 to 5.34 over 3.145 days. The two stars orbit each other with a period of 1.46 days and an eccentricity of 0.088. The mass ratio of the two stars is 0.775±0.024. The primary is 1.978 ± 0.010 times as massive as the Sun, 18.253 ± 2.249 its luminosity and has 3.375 ± 0.010 the Sun's radius. The secondary is 1.513 ± 0.008 times as massive as the Sun, 4.745 ± 0.583 its luminosity and has 1.650 ± 0.008 the Sun's radius. Both are yellow-white main sequence stars of spectral type F5V, though the primary has begun expanding and cooling as it nears the end of its time on the main sequence. A tertiary companion was discovered during the Two Micron All-Sky Survey.

The system shares a common proper motion with HR 4822, which is 5"2 away.

References

Corvus (constellation)
Spectroscopic binaries
Corvi, VV
110317
061910
Durchmusterung objects
F-type subgiants
4821